Euro Youth Football Association (FA Euro or FA Euro New York) is a soccer team based in Brooklyn, New York that plays in USL League Two. The club is a 501(c)(3) non-profit youth soccer organization based in Brooklyn, New York. Established in 2013, FA Euro New York focuses on providing prospective youth players with a pathway to play at the professional and/or collegiate levels.
 
In order to prepare players for the transition to the "next level" when the time is right, FA Euro New York combines a player-centered, player-development-based training model with resources and connections to NCAA programs and professional clubs around the world. FA Euro’s Senior Team competes in the USL League Two, which provides Club players with the opportunity to continue developing and growing their games with the Club even while playing at the collegiate level. USL League Two competition also provides players with exposure to USL and MLS scouts from across the country.

History 
For the past decade, Joe Balsamo has been running summer soccer camps and international tours. Originally known as FA Eurocamp, the goal of the program was to bring top European coaches to the United States to train American players and to expose them to the European soccer model. After expanding the program to include camps in New York, New Jersey, Connecticut, and Florida, Balsamo added a new service, tours. On these tours, FA Eurocamp escorted American teams through Europe and South America as they played exhibition matches against youth teams at the world’s top clubs. Since the Club's birth in 2013, FA Euro has grown from a small organization consisting of three staff members and only one team into a household name in US Youth Soccer. FA Euro New York was announced as a semi-professional men's team when the PDL released its 2013 schedule.

Stadium 
FA Euro New York's USL League Two team played its home matches at Belson Stadium, on the campus of St. John's University in Queens, New York from 2013 to 2018. The venue can seat 2,168 fans. For the 2018 season, the club moved its home matches to the Aviator Sports and Events Center in Brooklyn.  In 2019, the Club moved to the Dyker Heights campus of Poly Prep Country Day School. 

In 2021, the club played the majority of their home games at Calvert Vaux Park, though their first home game was played at Central Park's Field #2.

Year-by-year

References 

2013 establishments in New York City
Association football clubs established in 2013
Soccer clubs in New York City
USL League Two teams
Sports in Brooklyn